Urbanice is a municipality and village in Hradec Králové District in the Hradec Králové Region of the Czech Republic. It has about 300 inhabitants.

Geography
It lies in a flat agricultural landscape of the East Elbe Table.

History
The first mention of Urbanice is in a deed of King George of Poděbrady from 1465. Originally, the village was a property of the monastery in Opatovice nad Labem, but the monastery was destroyed during the Hussite Wars, and Urbanice was acquired by the city of Hradec Králové and joined to the Kunětice Mountain estate.

In 1561, Urbanice was bought by the Knight Jindřich Nejedlý of Vysoká and joined to the Libčany estate. Jindřich's descendants owned the estate until 1674. In 1674, it was inherited by Myslibor Petr Straka of Nedabylice. The estate didn't change owners until 1886, when it was acquired by Count Jan Harrach. The Harrach family were the last noble owners before the municipality gained self-governance.

Sights
There are no significant historical monuments in Urbanice. A monument of local importance is the cross from 1860, standing between five old linden trees. The bell tower, built in 1929, replaced the old oak trunk on which the bell, cast in 1803, was hung. There is also a statue of the Virgin Mary from 1908.

References

External links

Villages in Hradec Králové District